This is a list of football clubs in Norway, sorted for the 2020 season:

Men

By league and division
National
Eliteserien (Level 1)
1. divisjon (Level 2)
2. divisjon (Level 3)
Group 1–2
3. divisjon (Level 4)
Group 1–6
Regional
4. divisjon (Level 5)
Group 1–22 (Østfold, Akershus, Oslo 1, Oslo 2, Indre Østland, Buskerud, Vestfold, Telemark, Agder, Rogaland 1, Rogaland 2, Hordaland 1, Hordaland 2, Sogn og Fjordane, Sunnmøre, Nordmøre og Romsdal, Trøndelag 1, Trøndelag 2, Nordland, Hålogaland, Troms, Finnmark) 
5. divisjon (Level 6)
Group 1–35 (Østfold, Akershus, Oslo 1, Oslo 2, Oslo 3, Indre Østland 1, Indre Østland 2, Buskerud, Vestfold, Telemark, Agder 1, Agder 2, Rogaland 1, Rogaland 2, Rogaland 3, Rogaland 4, Hordaland 1, Hordaland 2, Hordaland 3, Sogn og Fjordane, Sunnmøre, Nordmøre og Romsdal, Trøndelag 1, Trøndelag 2, Trøndelag 3, Trøndelag 4, Nordland, Hålogaland 1, Hålogaland 2, Hålogaland 3, Hålogaland 4, Troms, Finnmark 1, Finnmark 2, Finnmark 3)
6. divisjon (Level 7)
7. divisjon (Level 8)
8. divisjon (Level 9)
9. divisjon (Level 10)

Alphabetically
The divisions are correct for the 2020 season.

Key



A

B

C

D

E

F

G

H

I

J

K

L

M

N

O

P

R

S

T

U

V

Women

Toppserien (1st level) 
 Arna-Bjørnar
 Avaldsnes
 Klepp
 Kolbotn
 LSK Kvinner
 Lyn
 Røa
 Sandviken
 Trondheims-Ørn
 Vålerenga

1. divisjon (2nd level) 
 Amazon Grimstad
 Åsane
 Fløya
 Grei
 Hønefoss
 KIL/Hemne
 Medkila
 Øvrevoll Hosle

External links
Fotball.no

Norway
 
football clubs
Football